The 2010–11 Buffalo Sabres season was the 41st season for the National Hockey League (NHL) franchise that was established on May 22, 1970. Due to the 2004–05 NHL lockout, this was the 40th season of play for the franchise and was celebrated as such by the team.

As of 2022, this is the last time the Sabres qualified for postseason play and their last season with a winning record.

Off-season
To commemorate the team's 40th anniversary, the Sabres went retro, reverting to their pre-1996 logo and to the design of the first season uniforms (blue with gold and white trim) with a silver trim the team has been using as a third uniform since the 2008–09 season. The new road uniforms would be white with blue and gold trim, similar to the original 1970–71 uniforms; a new third jersey was used paying homage to the AHL Bisons that played in the city prior to 1970. The jersey would come complete with the team's 40th anniversary logo (the current logo with "1970", the team's first season, inside.)

Regular season

Franchise sale 
On November 30, 2010, Ken Campbell of The Hockey News reported a story that billionaire Terrence Pegula had signed a letter of intent to purchase the Sabres from owners Tom Golisano, Larry Quinn and Daniel DiPofi for US$150 million. Pegula was the founder, president and CEO of East Resources, one of the largest privately held companies in the United States before selling the company. After the report was released, Quinn claimed that the report was "untrue" but had refused further comment. The $150 million was later determined to be an undervalued amount, as Forbes magazine had valued the team at just under $170 million in 2010.

In December 2010, Pegula officially expressed interest in buying the Sabres for $170 million and submitted a letter of intent to the NHL.

In January 2011, Golisano reportedly issued a counteroffer with an asking price of US$175 million. An agreement between Pegula and Golisano to sell the team was reached on January 29, 2011, with Pegula buying the team for $189 million ($175 million with $14 million in debt included) with the Sabres and Golisano officially making an announcement in a press conference on February 3, 2011. League owners approved the sale on February 18. In the conference, it was revealed that an unnamed bidder submitted a much higher bid than Pegula's, but made the bid contingent upon moving the team. The description is consistent with that of Jim Balsillie, who has made public his efforts to move a team to Hamilton, Ontario, a move that the Sabres have actively opposed. Terry Pegula named former Pittsburgh Penguins executive Ted Black to be the team president. Pegula was introduced as the Sabres' owner in a public ceremony at HSBC Arena on February 23, accompanied by what would be the final appearance of all three members of The French Connection line before Rick Martin's death three weeks later.

Divisional standings

Conference standings

Schedule and results

Pre-season 

|- align="center" bgcolor="#ccffcc"
| 1 || September 25 || Toronto Maple Leafs || 1-3 || Buffalo Sabres || || Miller || 1-0-0 || 
|- align="center" bgcolor="#ffcccc"
| 2 || September 27 || Buffalo Sabres || 4-5 || Toronto Maple Leafs || || Enroth || 1-1-0 || 
|- align="center" bgcolor="#ccffcc"
| 3 || September 28 (in Dundas, Ontario) || Buffalo Sabres || 2-1 || Ottawa Senators || || Miller || 2-1-0 || 
|- align="center" bgcolor="#ccffcc"
| 4 || September 30 || Buffalo Sabres || 5-3 || Montreal Canadiens || || Enroth || 3-1-0 || 
|- align="center" bgcolor="#ffcccc"
| 5 || October 1 || Buffalo Sabres || 1-3 || Philadelphia Flyers || || Miller || 3-2-0 || 
|- align="center" bgcolor="#ccffcc"
| 6 || October 3 || Philadelphia Flyers || 3-9 || Buffalo Sabres || || Miller || 4-2-0 || 
|-

Regular season

Game log 

|- align="center" bgcolor="#ccffcc"
| 1 || 8 || @ Ottawa Senators || 2-1 || Miller || Scotiabank Place/19,350 || 1-0-0
|- align="center" bgcolor="#ffcccc"
| 2 || 9 || New York Rangers || 3-6 || Miller || HSBC Arena/18,690 || 1-1-0
|- align="center" bgcolor="#ffcccc"
| 3 || 11 || Chicago Blackhawks || 3-4 || Miller || HSBC Arena/17,896 || 1-2-0
|- align="center" bgcolor="#fdbb30"
| 4 || 13 || New Jersey Devils || 0-1 (OT) || Miller || HSBC Arena/18,690 || 1-2-1
|- align="center" bgcolor="#ffcccc"
| 5 || 15 || Montreal Canadiens || 1-2 || Miller || HSBC Arena/17,264 || 1-3-1
|- align="center" bgcolor="#ffcccc"
| 6 || 16 || @ Chicago Blackhawks || 3-4 || Lalime || United Center/21,293 || 1-4-1
|- align="center" bgcolor="#ccffcc"
| 7 || 20 || @ Atlanta Thrashers || 4-1 || Miller || Philips Arena/8,820 || 2-4-1
|- align="center" bgcolor="#ffcccc"
| 8 || 22 || Ottawa Senators || 2-4 || Miller || HSBC Arena/18,009 || 2-5-1
|- align="center" bgcolor="#ccffcc"
| 9 || 23 || @ New Jersey Devils || 6-1 || Miller || Prudential Center/14,228 || 3-5-1
|- align="center" bgcolor="#ffcccc"
| 10 || 26 || @ Philadelphia Flyers || 3-6 || Miller || Wells Fargo Center/19,361 || 3-6-1
|- align="center" bgcolor="#fdbb30"
| 11 || 29 || @ Atlanta Thrashers || 3-4 (OT) || Miller || Philips Arena/10,172 || 3-6-2
|- align="center" bgcolor="#ffcccc"
| 12 || 30 || @ Dallas Stars || 0-4 || Lalime || American Airlines Center/15,015 || 3-7-2
|-

|- align="center" bgcolor="#ffcccc"
| 13 || 3 || Boston Bruins || 2-5 || Enroth || HSBC Arena/18,428 || 3-8-2
|- align="center" bgcolor="#ffcccc"
| 14 || 5 || Montreal Canadiens || 2-3 || Lalime || HSBC Arena/18,026 || 3-9-2
|- align="center" bgcolor="#ccffcc"
| 15 || 6 || @ Toronto Maple Leafs || 3-2 (SO) || Enroth || Air Canada Centre/19,329 || 4-9-2
|- align="center" bgcolor="#ccffcc"
| 16 || 10 || @ New Jersey Devils || 5-4 (SO) || Enroth || Prudential Center/14,566 || 5-9-2
|- align="center" bgcolor="#ffcccc"
| 17 || 11 || @ New York Rangers || 2-3 (OT) || Enroth || Madison Square Garden/17,848 || 5-9-3
|- align="center" bgcolor="#ccffcc"
| 18 || 13 || Washington Capitals || 3-2 (OT) || Miller || HSBC Arena/18,690 || 6-9-3
|- align="center" bgcolor="#ccffcc"
| 19 || 15 || Vancouver Canucks || 4-3 (OT) || Miller || HSBC Arena/18,690 || 7-9-3
|- align="center" bgcolor="#ffcccc"
| 20 || 17 || @ Washington Capitals || 2-4 || Miller || Verizon Center/18,398 || 7-10-3
|- align="center" bgcolor="#ccffcc"
| 21 || 19 || Los Angeles Kings || 4-2 || Miller || HSBC Arena/18,418 || 8-10-3
|- align="center" bgcolor="#ffcccc"
| 22 || 20 || Tampa Bay Lightning || 1-2 || Lalime || HSBC Arena/17,833 || 8-11-3
|- align="center" bgcolor="#ffcccc"
| 23 || 24 || Pittsburgh Penguins || 0-1 || Enroth || HSBC Arena/18,250 || 8-12-3
|- align="center" bgcolor="#ccffcc"
| 24 || 26 || Toronto Maple Leafs || 3-1 || Miller || HSBC Arena/18,004 || 9-12-3
|- align="center" bgcolor="#ffcccc"
| 25 || 27 || @ Montreal Canadiens || 1-3 || Miller || Bell Centre/21,273 || 9-13-3
|-

|- align="center" bgcolor="#ccffcc"
| 26 || 3 || Columbus Blue Jackets || 5-0 || Miller || HSBC Arena/18,529 || 10-13-3
|- align="center" bgcolor="#ccffcc"
| 27 || 4 || @ Ottawa Senators || 1-0 (SO) || Miller || Scotiabank Place/16,364 || 11-13-3
|- align="center" bgcolor="#ffcccc"
| 28 || 7 || @ Boston Bruins || 2-3 (OT) || Miller || TD Garden/17,565 || 11-13-4
|- align="center" bgcolor="#ccffcc"
| 29 || 9 || San Jose Sharks || 6-3 || Miller || HSBC Arena/18,017 || 12-13-4
|- align="center" bgcolor="#ffcccc"
| 30 || 11 || Pittsburgh Penguins || 2-5 || Miller || HSBC Arena/18,690 || 12-14-4
|- align="center" bgcolor="#ccffcc"
| 31 || 15 || Boston Bruins || 3-2 || Miller || HSBC Arena/18,197 || 13-14-4
|- align="center" bgcolor="#ffcccc"
| 32 || 17 || @ Florida Panthers || 2-6 || Miller || BankAtlantic Center/16,894 || 13-15-4
|- align="center" bgcolor="#ffcccc"
| 33 || 18 || @ Tampa Bay Lightning || 1-3 || Miller || St. Pete Times Forum/17,141 || 13-16-4
|- align="center" bgcolor="#ccffcc"
| 34 || 21 || Mighty Ducks of Anaheim || 5-2 || Miller || HSBC Arena/18,690 || 14-16-4
|- align="center" bgcolor="#ffcccc"
| 35 || 23 || Florida Panthers || 3-4 || Miller || HSBC Arena/18,690 || 14-17-4
|- align="center" bgcolor="#ffcccc"
| 36 || 27 || @ Calgary Flames || 2-5 || Miller || Pengrowth Saddledome/19,289 || 14-18-4
|- align="center" bgcolor="#ccffcc"
| 37 || 28 || @ Edmonton Oilers || 4-2 || Miller || Rexall Place/16,839 || 15-18-4
|-

|- align="center" bgcolor="#ccffcc"
| 38 || 1 || Boston Bruins || 7-6 (SO) || Miller || HSBC Arena/18,690 || 16-18-4
|- align="center" bgcolor="#ffcccc"
| 39 || 4 || @ Colorado Avalanche || 3-4 (OT) || Miller || Pepsi Center/12,548 || 16-18-5
|- align="center" bgcolor="#ccffcc"
| 40 || 6 || @ San Jose Sharks || 3-0 || Miller || HP Pavilion/17,562 || 17-18-5
|- align="center" bgcolor="#ccffcc"
| 41 || 8 || @ Phoenix Coyotes || 2-1 || Miller || Jobing.com Arena/13,905 || 18-18-5
|- align="center" bgcolor="#ffcccc"
| 42 || 11 || Philadelphia Flyers || 2-5 || Miller || HSBC Arena/18,155 || 18-19-5
|- align="center" bgcolor="#ccffcc"
| 43 || 13 || Carolina Hurricanes || 3-2 || Miller || HSBC Arena/18,276 || 19-19-5
|- align="center" bgcolor="#ffcccc"
| 44 || 15 || @ New York Islanders || 3-5 || Miller || Nassau Veterans Memorial Coliseum/12,223 || 19-20-5
|- align="center" bgcolor="#ccffcc"
| 45 || 18 || Montreal Canadiens || 4-2 || Miller || HSBC Arena/17,565 || 20-20-5
|- align="center" bgcolor="#ccffcc"
| 46 || 20 || @ Boston Bruins || 2-1 (OT) || Miller || TD Garden/18,225 || 21-20-5
|- align="center" bgcolor="#ffcccc"
| 47 || 21 || New York Islanders || 2-5 || Lalime || HSBC Arena/18,690 || 21-21-5
|- align="center" bgcolor="#ccffcc"
| 48 || 23 || @ New York Islanders || 5-3 || Miller || Nassau Veterans Memorial Coliseum/10,120 || 22-21-5
|- align="center" bgcolor="#ccffcc"
| 49 || 25 || @ Ottawa Senators || 3-2 (OT) || Miller || Scotiabank Place/18,990 || 23-21-5
|-

|- align="center" bgcolor="#ffcccc"
| 50 || 4 || @ Pittsburgh Penguins || 2-3 || Miller || Consol Energy Center/18,315 || 23-22-5
|- align="center" bgcolor="#ccffcc"
| 51 || 5 || Toronto Maple Leafs || 6-2 || Miller || HSBC Arena/18,264 || 24-22-5
|- align="center" bgcolor="#ccffcc"
| 52 || 8 || @ Tampa Bay Lightning || 7-4 || Miller || St. Pete Times Forum/14,444 || 25-22-5
|- align="center" bgcolor="#ccffcc"
| 53 || 10 || @ Florida Panthers || 3-2 (OT) || Miller || BankAtlantic Center/14,559 || 26-22-5
|- align="center" bgcolor="#ffcccc"
| 54 || 13 || New York Islanders || 6-7 (OT) || Miller || HSBC Arena/18,690 || 26-22-6
|- align="center" bgcolor="#ccffcc"
| 55 || 15 || @ Montreal Canadiens || 3-2 (SO) || Enroth || Bell Centre/21,273 || 27-22-6
|- align="center" bgcolor="#ffcccc"
| 56 || 16 || Toronto Maple Leafs || 1-2 || Miller || HSBC Arena/18,414 || 27-23-6
|- align="center" bgcolor="#ffcccc"
| 57 || 18 || St. Louis Blues || 0-3 || Miller || HSBC Arena/18,493 || 27-24-6
|- align="center" bgcolor="#ffcccc"
| 58 || 20 || Washington Capitals || 1-2 || Miller || HSBC Arena/18,690 || 27-25-6
|- align="center" bgcolor="#ccffcc"
| 59 || 23 || Atlanta Thrashers || 4-1 || Miller || HSBC Arena/18,690 || 28-25-6
|- align="center" bgcolor="#ccffcc"
| 60 || 25 || Ottawa Senators || 4-2 || Miller || HSBC Arena/18,690 || 29-25-6
|- align="center" bgcolor="#ffcccc"
| 61 || 26 || Detroit Red Wings || 2-3 (SO) || Miller || HSBC Arena/18,690 || 29-25-7
|-

|- align="center" bgcolor="#ccffcc"
| 62 || 1 || @ New York Rangers || 3-2 || Miller || Madison Square Garden/18,200 || 30-25-7
|- align="center" bgcolor="#ffcccc"
| 63 || 3 || @ Carolina Hurricanes || 2-3 (OT) || Miller || RBC Center/15,213 || 30-25-8
|- align="center" bgcolor="#ccffcc"
| 64 || 5 || @ Philadelphia Flyers || 5-3 || Miller || Wells Fargo Center/19,901 || 31-25-8
|- align="center" bgcolor="#ccffcc"
| 65 || 6 || @ Minnesota Wild || 3-2 || Enroth || Xcel Energy Center/18,091 || 32-25-8
|- align="center" bgcolor="#ffcccc"
| 66 || 8 || @ Pittsburgh Penguins || 1-3 || Miller || Consol Energy Center/18,314 || 32-26-8
|- align="center" bgcolor="#ccffcc"
| 67 || 10 || @ Boston Bruins || 4-3 (OT) || Miller || TD Garden/17,565 || 33-26-8
|- align="center" bgcolor="#ffcccc"
| 68 || 12 || @ Toronto Maple Leafs || 3-4 || Miller || Air Canada Centre/19,347 || 33-27-8
|- align="center" bgcolor="#ccffcc"
| 69 || 13 || Ottawa Senators || 6-4 || Enroth || HSBC Arena/18,690 || 34-27-8
|- align="center" bgcolor="#ffcccc"
| 70 || 15 || Carolina Hurricanes || 0-1 || Miller || HSBC Arena/18,690 || 34-28-8
|- align="center" bgcolor="#ccffcc"
| 71 || 19 || Atlanta Thrashers || 8-2 || Miller || HSBC Arena/18,690 || 35-28-8
|- align="center" bgcolor="#ffcccc"
| 72 || 20 || Nashville Predators || 3-4 (OT) || Miller || HSBC Arena/18,690 || 35-28-9
|- align="center" bgcolor="#ccffcc"
| 73 || 22 || @ Montreal Canadiens || 2-0 || Miller || Bell Centre/21,273 || 36-28-9
|- align="center" bgcolor="#ccffcc"
| 74 || 25 || Florida Panthers || 4-2 || Miller || HSBC Arena/18,690 || 37-28-9
|- align="center" bgcolor="#ccffcc"
| 75 || 26 || New Jersey Devils || 2-0 || Miller || HSBC Arena/18,690 || 38-28-9
|- align="center" bgcolor="#ffcccc"
| 76 || 29 || @ Toronto Maple Leafs || 3-4 || Miller || Air Canada Centre/19,483 || 38-29-9
|- align="center" bgcolor="#ccffcc"
| 77 || 30 || New York Rangers || 1-0 || Enroth || HSBC Arena/18,690 || 39-29-9
|-

|- align="center" bgcolor="#ffcccc"
| 78 || 2 || @ Washington Capitals || 4-5 (OT) || Enroth || Verizon Center/18,398 || 39-29-10
|- align="center" bgcolor="#ccffcc"
| 79 || 3 || @ Carolina Hurricanes || 2-1 (OT) || Enroth || RBC Center/18,740 || 40-29-10
|- align="center" bgcolor="#ccffcc"
| 80 || 5 || Tampa Bay Lightning || 4-2 || Enroth || HSBC Arena/18,690 || 41-29-10
|- align="center" bgcolor="#ccffcc"
| 81 || 8 || Philadelphia Flyers || 4-3 (OT) || Miller || HSBC Arena/18,690 || 42-29-10
|- align="center" bgcolor="#ccffcc"
| 82 || 9 || @ Columbus Blue Jackets || 5-4 || Enroth || Nationwide Arena/18,717 || 43-29-10
|-

|-
| 2010-2011 Schedule

Playoffs 
The Sabres qualified for the playoffs and played the Philadelphia Flyers in the Eastern Conference Quarterfinals. The Sabres–Flyers series marked the ninth time, and first since 2006, the teams have met in the playoffs, most of any Sabres opponent. The Flyers lead the match-up four series to three. This series was the first time a Sabres–Flyers series has gone seven games.

Playoff log

|- style="background:#CCFFCC"
|1|| April 14 || Buffalo Sabres || 1–0 || Philadelphia Flyers || || None  || Kaleta  || Miller   || 19,929|| 1-0 ||  
|- style="background:#FFBBBB"
|2|| April 16 || Buffalo Sabres || 4–5  || Philadelphia Flyers || || Briere, Carcillo, Giroux, Leino, van Riemsdyk  || Vanek (2), McCormick, Sekera  || Miller  || 19,942  || 1–1 || 
|- style="background:#FFBBBB"
|3|| April 18 || Philadelphia Flyers || 4–2 || Buffalo Sabres || || Carter, Briere, Zherdev, Timonen||  Stafford, Gerbe   || Miller || 18,690||  1-2 || 
|- style="background:#CCFFCC"
|4|| April 20 || Philadelphia Flyers ||0–1 || Buffalo Sabres || || None  || Pominville   || Miller  || 18,690  || 2-2 ||  
|- style="background:#CCFFCC"
|5|| April 22 || Buffalo Sabres || 4–3 OT  || Philadelphia Flyers || 5:31 || van Riemsdyk, Meszaros, Briere || Ennis (2), Vanek, Gragnani || Miller || 19,959 || 3-2 ||  
|- style="background:#FFBBBB"
|6|| April 24  || Philadelphia Flyers || 5–4 OT  || Buffalo Sabres || 4:43 || Briere (2), van Riemsdyk, Hartnell, Leino || Niedermayer, Vanek (2), Gerbe || Miller || 18,690  || 3-3 || 
|- style="background:#FFBBBB"
|7|| April 26 || Buffalo Sabres || 2–5 || Philadelphia Flyers || || Coburn, Briere, Giroux, Leino, Carcillo  ||  Myers, Boyes || Miller  ||19,959 ||3-4 ||
|-

| Scorer of game-winning goal in italics*Denotes if necessary

Player statistics

Skaters
Note: GP = Games played; G = Goals; A = Assists; Pts = Points; +/− = Plus/minus; PIM = Penalty minutes

Goaltenders
Note: GP = Games played; TOI = Time on ice (minutes); W = Wins; L = Losses; OT = Overtime losses; GA = Goals against; GAA= Goals against average; SA= Shots against; SV= Saves; Sv% = Save percentage; SO= Shutouts

†Denotes player spent time with another team before joining Sabres. Stats reflect time with Sabres only.
‡Traded mid-season. Stats reflect time with Sabres only.

Awards and records

Awards

Records

Milestones

Transactions 
The Sabres have been involved in the following transactions during the 2010–11 season.

Trades

|}

Free agents acquired

Free agents lost

Claimed via waivers

Lost via waivers

Lost via retirement

Player signings

Draft selections
The 2010 NHL Entry Draft was held June 25–26, 2010 at the Staples Center in Los Angeles.

See also 
 2010–11 NHL season

Farm teams

Portland Pirates 

The Portland Pirates remain Buffalo's top affiliate in the American Hockey League in 2010–11.

References 

Buffalo Sabres seasons
B
B
Buffalo
Buffalo